Exeter is a small town approximately 24 kilometres north of the city of Launceston, Tasmania, Australia. At the 2016 census, Exeter had a population of 633.

It is an important town agriculturally due to its positioning in the centre of a large rural area known for its orchards, dairy and beef cattle, fruit produce and sheep herds.

Features
The Exeter Methodist Church is a timber building that was completed in 1861, being the oldest Methodist Church in Tasmania. It was used by the infamous bushranger Matthew Brady to identify potential victims below.

Education
Exeter High School is a comprehensive secondary school located on Glen-Ard-Mohr Road. It was established in 1985, following a reorganisation of the earlier Exeter District School.

References

Towns in Tasmania
Localities of West Tamar Council